David Collins (dates unknown) was an English first-class cricketer active in 1791 and 1792 who played for Hampshire and Marylebone Cricket Club (MCC).

References

Bibliography
  
 

Year of birth unknown
Year of death unknown
English cricketers
English cricketers of 1787 to 1825
Hampshire cricketers
Marylebone Cricket Club cricketers
Surrey cricketers
Non-international England cricketers